The resolution on recognition of the state sovereignty of the Chechen Republic of Ichkeria is a bill proposed by Oleksiy Honcharenko and Musa Mahomedov in which the Verkhovna Rada, the Ukrainian parliament, will vote on the recognition of Chechnya's independence, in response to Russia's recognition of the Luhansk People's Republic and the Donetsk People's Republic.

On November 9 2022, the Verkhovna Rada of Ukraine also registered a draft resolution on the recognition of state sovereignty and independence of Tatarstan.

History
It was received by the Verkhovna Rada on 11 July and handed over to the leadership on the same day. It was sent to the committee for consideration on the 13 July and was provided for reference on 14 July. On 18 October 2022, the decision of the Verkhovna Rada to recognize the Chechen Republic of Ichkeria as temporarily occupied by Russia awaits the signature of President Volodymyr Zelenskyy. Ukrainian parliamentarians also condemned what called Russia's genocide of the Chechen people in a corresponding document.

In early November, Zelenskyy responded to the Verkhovna Rada's vote and a petition with 25,000 signatures by ordering the Ukrainian Ministry of Foreign Affairs to research if, how, and in which form Ukraine could recognize the Chechen Republic of Ichkeria. He emphasized that it was the Ukrainian President's prerogative to extend full diplomatic recognition to other states.

Reactions
  – On 13 July, Ramzan Kadyrov, the head of Chechnya, called the draft resolution as "absolutely ridiculous and absurd" and recalled that "Ichkeria does not exist even on paper" and added  "It was liquidated by the former Ichkerians themselves, who announced in 2007 the abolition of Ichkeria and the creation of the so-called Imarat Kavkaz".

References

Law of Ukraine